Land use, land-use change, and forestry (LULUCF), also referred to as Forestry and other land use (FOLU), is defined as a "greenhouse gas inventory sector that covers emissions and removals of greenhouse gases resulting from direct human-induced land use such as settlements and commercial uses, land-use change, and forestry activities."

LULUCF has impacts on the global carbon cycle and as such, these activities can add or remove carbon dioxide (or, more generally, carbon) from the atmosphere, influencing climate. LULUCF has been the subject of two major reports by the Intergovernmental Panel on Climate Change (IPCC), but is difficult to measure. Additionally, land use is of critical importance for biodiversity.

A related term in the context of climate change mitigation is AFOLU which stands for "agriculture, forestry and other land use".

Development 
The United Nations Framework Convention on Climate Change (UNFCCC) Article 4(1)(a) requires all Parties to "develop, periodically update, publish and make available to the Conference of the Parties" as well as "national inventories of anthropogenic emissions by sources" "removals by sinks of all greenhouse gases not controlled by the Montreal Protocol."

Under the UNFCCC reporting guidelines, human-induced greenhouse emissions must be reported in six sectors: energy (including stationary energy and transport); industrial processes; solvent and other product use; agriculture; waste; and land use, land use change and forestry (LULUCF).

The rules governing accounting and reporting of greenhouse gas emissions from LULUCF under the Kyoto Protocol are contained in several decisions of the Conference of Parties under the UNFCCC.

LULUCF has been the subject of two major reports by the Intergovernmental Panel on Climate Change (IPCC).

The Kyoto Protocol article 3.3 thus requires mandatory LULUCF accounting for afforestation (no forest for last 50 years), reforestation (no forest on 31 December 1989) and deforestation, as well as (in the first commitment period) under article 3.4 voluntary accounting for cropland management, grazing land management, revegetation and forest management (if not already accounted under article 3.3).

This decision sets out the rules that govern how Kyoto Parties with emission reduction commitments (so-called Annex 1 Parties) account for changes in carbon stocks in land use, land-use change and forestry. It is mandatory for Annex 1 Parties to account for changes in carbons stocks resulting from deforestation, reforestation and afforestation (B Article 3.3) and voluntary to account for emissions from forest management, cropland management, grazing land management and revegetation (B. Article 3.4).

Climate impacts

Land-use change can be a factor in CO2 (carbon dioxide) atmospheric concentration, and is thus a contributor to global climate change. IPCC estimates that land-use change (e.g. conversion of forest into agricultural land) contributes a net 1.6 ± 0.8 Gt carbon per year to the atmosphere. For comparison, the major source of CO2, namely emissions from fossil fuel combustion and cement production, amount to 6.3 ± 0.6 Gt carbon per year.

In 2021 the Global Carbon Project estimated annual land-use change emissions were 4.1 ± 2.6 Gt  ( not carbon: 1 Gt carbon = 3.67 Gt  ) for 2011–2020.

The impact of land-use change on the climate is also more and more recognized by the climate modeling community. On regional or local scales, the impact of LUC can be assessed by Regional climate models (RCMs). This is however difficult, particularly for variables, which are inherently noisy, such as precipitation. For this reason, it is suggested to conduct RCM ensemble simulations.

Extents and mapping

A 2021 study estimated, with higher resolution data, that land-use change has affected 17% of land in 1960–2019, or when considering multiple change events 32%, "around four times" previous estimates. They also investigate its drivers, identifying global trade affecting agriculture as a main driver.

Forest modeling
Traditionally, earth system modeling has been used to analyze forests for climate projections. However, in recent years there has been a shift away from this modeling towards more of mitigation and adaptation projections. These projections can give researchers a better understanding of what future forest management practices should be employed.  Furthermore, this new approach to modeling also allows for land management practices to be analyzed in the model. Such land management practices can be: forest harvest, tree species selection, grazing, and crop harvest. These land management practices are implemented to understand their biophysical and biogeochemical effects on the forest. However, there is a major lack of available data for these practices currently, so there needs to be further monitoring and data collecting to help improve the accuracy of the models.

See also 
Agricultural expansion
Deforestation and climate change
Land use
Satoyama
Special Report on Climate Change and Land

References

External links
Land Use, Land-Use Change and Forestry (LULUCF) at UNFCCC
IPCC Special Report on Land Use, Land-Use Change, and Forestry

Biodiversity
Climate change and the environment
Environmental issues with forests
Land use